Scopula antankarana is a moth of the family Geometridae. It is found on Madagascar.

References

Moths described in 1956
antankarana
Moths of Madagascar
Taxa named by Claude Herbulot